George Edmond Bates (11 August 1933 – 30 March 1999) was bishop of the Episcopal Diocese of Utah from 1986 to 1996.

Biography
He was born in Binghamton, New York on August 11, 1933. He received his bachelor's degree from Dartmouth College and his master of divinity degree from the Episcopal Theological School in Cambridge, Massachusetts. He was ordained to the deaconate in June 1958 and to the priesthood in 1959. In 1986 he was elected as the ninth bishop of Utah and was consecrated on October 25. He retired his post in June 1996. Bates died on March 30, 1999, in Medford, Oregon.

External links 
Bishop George Bates dies in Oregon

1933 births
1999 deaths
People from Binghamton, New York
20th-century American Episcopalians
Episcopal bishops of Utah
20th-century American clergy